Michael Blake Dean (born February 25, 1988) is a former professional baseball player who is currently the head coach of the New Orleans Privateers baseball program.

Playing career
Dean played collegiately at Louisiana State University (LSU).  He was one of LSU's leading hitters and was named MVP of the 2008 SEC baseball tournament.  He has also received many other freshman awards, such as 2007 Collegiate Baseball Freshman All-American; 2007 Freshman All-SEC; 2007 Louisiana Freshman of the Year; SEC Freshman of the Week (May 7, 2007 and April 16, 2007).

Blake Dean tried out as a pitcher, coming out of high school.  He was on the verge of getting cut, because he lacked velocity. He was quickly converted to a first baseman, after his coach saw him hit batting practice. He started all four years at first base and was one of the best power hitters in LSU baseball history. In 2007, he played collegiate summer baseball for the Wareham Gatemen of the Cape Cod Baseball League, and was selected to participate in the league's All-Star Home Run Derby.

In 2008 while helping lead his team to the 2008 College World Series, Dean was named a Baseball America First-Team All-American. In 2009 Dean was given another All-America selection as he was named to the pre-Season All-America team by Baseball America (2nd team) and Rivals.com (1st team). In 2010 Dean was a candidate for the Lowe's Senior Class Award.

He was drafted in the tenth round of the Major League Baseball Amateur Draft in the summer of 2009 by the Minnesota Twins, but did not sign. He then was drafted in the eighth round by the Los Angeles Dodgers in 2010. He spent two years in the Dodgers' farm system, one with the Ogden Raptors and one with the Great Lakes Loons.

Coaching career
Dean became an assistant for the New Orleans Privateers baseball team after retiring from professional play.

After three seasons as an assistant, Dean was named the interim head coach heading into the 2016 season and, soon after, named permanent head coach.

Statistics 

References:

Head coaching record
Below is a table of Dean's yearly records as an NCAA head baseball coach.

References

External links 

Blake Dean bio  at LSUSports.net

1988 births
Living people
LSU Tigers baseball players
Wareham Gatemen players
People from Fort Walton Beach, Florida
Ogden Raptors players
Great Lakes Loons players
Baseball players from Florida
New Orleans Privateers baseball coaches